Nangli or Nangali may refer to:

 Nangali, a village in Kolar district, Karnataka, India
 Nangli, Amritsar, a village in Punjab, India 
 Nangli, Rajasthan, a village in Alwar District, Rajasthan, India
 Nangli Godha, a village in Rewari District, Haryana, India
 Nangli Poona, a village in northwest Delhi, India
 Nangli Sakrawati, a village in southwest Delhi, India
 Nangli Wazidpur, a village in Uttar Pradesh
 Nangli Razapur, a village of Chauhan Rajput Community located in South Delhi, India
 Nangli Parsapur, a village in Rewari District, Haryana, India
 Nangli Saledi Singh, a village in Rajasthan, India
 Raipur Nangli, a village in Uttar Pradesh, India